Walter Bryant Ford (born December 28, 2004) is an American professional baseball pitcher in the Seattle Mariners organization.

Amateur career
Ford grew up in Bessemer, Alabama, but began his high school career at Pace High School in Pace, Florida before transferring to Hoover High School in Hoover, Alabama for his sophomore season in 2021. For the season, he pitched  innings and compiled a 1.85 ERA. He spent that summer competing with USA Baseball on their 18U National Team. Originally set to graduate in 2023, he reclassified to the class of 2022 in September 2021. He also transferred back to Pace for his senior year. He entered his senior season as one of the top prospects for the upcoming draft, alongside being the youngest player eligible. He helped lead Pace to the 6A state championship, where they fell 5-4. He ended the season 10-2 with a 1.00 ERA, 126 strikeouts, and thirty walks over  innings. He was named the 6A Player of the Year and earned All-State honors. Ford committed to play college baseball for the Alabama Crimson Tide.

Professional career
Ford was selected by the Seattle Mariners with the 74th overall selection of the 2022 Major League Baseball draft. He signed with the team for $1.25 million.

References

2004 births
Living people
Baseball players from Alabama
Baseball pitchers